The 2012–13 Handball-Bundesliga was the 48th season of the Handball-Bundesliga, Germany's premier handball league, and the 36th season consisting of only one league.

Team information

Standings

Results

External links
 Handball-bundesliga website 

2012–13 domestic handball leagues
2012-13
2012 in German sport
2013 in German sport